The PowerBook 180 is a portable computer released by Apple Computer along with the PowerBook 160 in October 1992. At the time, it constituted the new top-of-the-range model, replacing the previous PowerBook 170. Its case design and features are the same as that of the 170, but it shipped with the more powerful 33 MHz Motorola 68030 CPU and Motorola 68882 FPU. Along with the 160, it introduced a new power-saving feature which allowed the processor to run at a slower 16 MHz rate, the same speed as the original 140.

A 1.44 MB floppy disk drive and 80 MB 2.5-inch hard drive were also standard.

The Apple Powerbook also gave an option of possible expansion to a 120 MB hard drive. They are equipped with keyboard stands to slant the keyboard.

Like the Macintosh Portable before it, with the addition of an external color video port (missing on the 170), the 180 became a full-featured, no-compromises desktop replacement, equivalent in performance to the Macintosh LC III+. It was sold until May 1994.

PowerBook 180c
In June 1993, Apple released an identical color version of this model, the PowerBook 180c (pictured below). It had an  diagonal active matrix color LCD capable of displaying 256 colors and was the first PowerBook to natively display 640×480 (all previous PowerBooks had 640×400 resolution). As a result of the thicker color display, the exterior case lid was redesigned, more closely resembling that used on the PowerBook Duo series. This modification was used on the PowerBook 165c for the same reason.

Timeline

References

External links
apple-history.com: PowerBook 180

180
68k Macintosh computers